LIF, LiF or Lif may refer to:

Music
 Mr. Lif (Jeffrey Haynes), a rapper
 "Lif", the last track on Horse the Band's album A Natural Death
 "Líf", a song by Hildur Vala Einarsdóttir

Science
 Leukemia inhibitory factor, a cytokine that affects cell growth and development
 Laser-induced fluorescence, a spectroscopic method
 Low insertion force sockets
 Lithium fluoride, a chemical compound used for windows, prisms, and lenses from vacuum UV to near IR range
 Left Iliac fossa, a part of human and primate anatomy
 Local inertial frame, a concept in general relativity

Other uses
 Liquid Impact Forming, metalworking process
 Liberal Forum, a former Austrian political party
 Leirvík ÍF (LÍF Leirvík) a Faroese football club
 Lif Island, an island of Papua New Guinea
 Líf and Lífþrasir, characters from Norse mythology

See also
 Liff (disambiguation)